Sunshine Locality is a  archeological site listed on the National Register of Historic Places is located in Long Valley, Nevada, United States. The Nevada State Museum, the Desert Research Institute have played a leadership role in the excavations at the site.

History 
The site was listed on the historic register in 1978 and was classified as a camp.

References 

Archaeological sites on the National Register of Historic Places in Nevada
Geography of White Pine County, Nevada
Native American history of Nevada
Nevada State Register of Historic Places
Paleo-Indian archaeological sites in the United States
Historic districts on the National Register of Historic Places in Nevada
National Register of Historic Places in White Pine County, Nevada